Cetomimus is a genus of flabby whalefishes.

Species
There are currently seven recognized species in this genus:
 Cetomimus compunctus T. Abe, Marumo & Kawaguchi, 1965
 Cetomimus craneae Harry, 1952
 Cetomimus gillii Goode & T. H. Bean, 1895
 Cetomimus hempeli Maul, 1969
 Cetomimus kerdops A. E. Parr, 1934
 Cetomimus picklei (Gilchrist, 1922)
 Cetomimus teevani Harry, 1952

See also
Video of a whalefish from Monterey Bay Aquarium Research Institute.

References

Cetomimidae
Marine fish genera
Taxa named by George Brown Goode
Taxa named by Tarleton Hoffman Bean